The Reminiscences of Tsiang T'ing-fu is an English memoir written by Tsiang Tingfu.  It contains chapters on Tsiang's family background, studying in the United States, teaching in Nankai University and Tsinghua University, visiting Moscow, and others. Due to the death of Tsiang on 9 October 1965, the oral autobiography was an unfinished project and was not completed until 1974 when it was embellished and revised by Anita O'Brien. 

The book was originally part of the Chinese Oral History Project, East Asian Institute of Columbia University, hosted by Franklin Ho and C. Martin Wilbur,  and done with Crystal Lorch Seidman.

The Reminiscences of Tsiang T'ing-fu was first published in 1974 by East Asian Institute of Columbia University in New York. The Chinese translation of the book was first published in 1979 by Biographical Literature Press in Taipei.

Published in Mainland China
In 2003, The Reminiscences of Tsiang T'ing-fu was first published in Mainland China in simplified Chinese by Yuelu Publishing House, but with abridgements.

References 

Censored books
Book censorship in China
1974 non-fiction books
1979 non-fiction books
2003 non-fiction books